Pierre le Pelley II, 14th Seigneur of Sark (1763–1820) was Seigneur of Sark from 1778 to 1820.

References

Seigneurs of Sark
Pierre II
1763 births
1820 deaths